Lake Hudson (or Hudson Lake) may refer to the following locations:

Hudson Lake, Indiana, a small community in Indiana
Hudson Lake station, a train station in Hudson Lake
Hudson Lake (New York), a lake in New York
Lake Hudson (Oklahoma), a reservoir in Oklahoma
Lake Hudson State Recreation Area, a park in Michigan